Lobo feroz is a 2023 Spanish-Uruguayan crime thriller film directed by Gustavo Hernández Ibañez remaking the 2013 film Big Bad Wolves. It stars Javier Gutiérrez, Adriana Ugarte, and Rubén Ochandiano alongside Juana Acosta, Manu Vega, Antonio Dechent, and Fernando Tejero.

Plot 
A woman eager for revenge crosses paths with a police agent while searching for a killer of girls.

Cast

Production 
Adapted by Juma Fodde and Conchi del Río, the screenplay is a remake of 2013 Israeli film Big Bad Wolvess. The film was produced by Bowfinger International Pictures, and Lobo Feroz AIE alongside Mother Superior, Esto También Pasará, Basque Films and FilmSharks with the participation of Netflix, and support from ICAA. It was fully shot in the province of Cádiz in February 2021 (including locations such as Vejer, El Puerto, or Chiclana), with San Fernando as home base.

Release 
Distributed by Filmax, the film was theatrically released in Spain on 27 January 2023.

Reception 

Javier Ocaña of El País assessed that the film incorporates vulgar dialogue and "laughable sequences that look like something out of a bad Guy Ritchie movie", otherwise featuring such a degree of gratuitous violence that it ends up being "torture porn without quality".

Sergio F. Pinilla of Cinemanía rated the film 3 out of 5 stars, considering that it "entertains, but pales in comparison to the original film".

See also 
 List of Spanish films of 2023

References 

2023 films
Film remakes
Films shot in the province of Cádiz
Spanish crime thriller films
Uruguayan thriller films
2020s Spanish-language films
2020s Spanish films
Spanish films about revenge
Bowfinger International Pictures films
Spanish remakes of foreign films